Botwin is a surname. Notable people with the surname include:

 Nancy Botwin, character in the television series Weeds
 Naftali Botwin (1907–1925), Polish communist and labour activist
 Will Botwin (born 1948), American talent manager

See also
 Bottin (surname)